is an adult simulation role-playing game developed by Circus that was released for the PC on May 29, 2009. It is abbreviated as VC. A manga based on the game has been released and an anime adaptation has been announced.

Summary 
Valkyrie Complex was Circus's next RPG after Eternal Fantasy and is incompatible with Windows 2000.

D.C.V 〜Da Capo Valkyrie Complex〜 was announced and the prelude disc was included with this game.

Story 
Our hero Leo Ritual lives in the small town in the Reysol kingdom. The world is divided into seven countries, and these countries are led by a god or goddess. The kingdoms are at war with each other, due to an argument among the gods. A world of giants that exists under the land is getting fed up with this war that is disturbing them, and they plan to invade. Leo and his warrior friends set off to stop them.

Characters 
 
 Voice - None, Height - 170cm, Weight - 58kg, Character Design - Akisoba
 The main character and an excellent swordsman.
 
 Voice - Ai Hinaki, Height - 166cm, Weight - ???kg, Character Design - Akisoba
 A Valkyrie who has lived since ancient times. She is stubborn and inflexible. She likes most animals and sweet things, but her taste for sweets is a secret.
 
 Voice - Alice Kagami, Height - 153cm, Weight - 46kg, Character Design - Amakusa Tobari
 Leo's childhood friend. She's a very strong and lively poster girl for a bakery. Because she is a sorceress and a major weapon geek, she can combine the two for attacks of many different attributes. She is good at making bread but cannot handle heat.
 
 Voice - Tomoe Tamiyasu, Height - 142cm, Weight - 42kg, Character Design - Chikotamu
 Leo's sister-in-law. She is a Healer who's held a secret love for Leo for many years. She's good at cooking and at breaking the ice.
 
 Voice - Ru Shiina, Height - 168cm, Weight - 52kg, Character Design - Akisoba
 17th Princess (youngest) of the Reysol Kingdom. She is a Fighter who, once she's decided on something, plunges straight ahead. Her skill with the sword surpasses Leo's. Loves hot springs, and can't stand the cold.
 
 Voice - Hijiri Kinomi, Height - 148cm, Weight - 37kg, Character Design - Lolieshi
 A mysterious girl who speaks in a boyish manner. Regina is a summoner from a family of magicians, she is a good magician. She has an unusually high potential, but for certain reasons half of it is sealed. 
 
 Voice - Aya Tachibana, Height - 139cm, Weight - 50kg, Character Design - Amakusa Tobari
 An automaton created with magic. Aside from being driven by magic, she seems like a normal girl. She is a Bard who uses a Harp as a weapon. She never gives up, but she's super clumsy.
 
 Voice - Izumi Maki, Height - 170cm, Weight - 51kg, Character Design - Akisoba
 A Sage with much knowledge and experience. She is very open towards the opposite sex and tends to tease Leo. A bespectacled beauty who loves alcohol.
 
 Voice - Saki Minase, Height - 168cm, Weight - 48kg, Character Design - Kagero Ohba 
 A half-elf archer who is looking for her sister's murderer. She is ignorant of the ways of the world and is not used to being around men.
 
 Voice - Chitose Sakura, Height - ???cm, Weight - ???kg, Character Design - Yuka Kayura
 A goddess of love. She can freely change her appearance, including from child to adult, but she usually appears as a child. Depending on her form, her divinity also fluctuates. She is selfish and self-centered, but, though there are exceptions, she is generally kind to her believers.

Staff 
 Director：Hiroshi Kushiro
 Original Artwork：Akisoba, Yuka Kayura, Amakusa Tobari, Chikotamu, Lolieshi, Kagero Ohba
 Scenario：Hiroshi Kushiro, Takashi Aki

Theme Songs 
 Opening Theme -  
 Lyrics：Ceui, Composition：Kotaru Odaka・Ceui, Arrangement：Kotaru Odaka, Vocals：Ceui
 Ending Theme - "Oneness"
 Lyrics・Composition：Shihori, Arrangement：Tomohisa Ishikawa, Vocals：Shihori
 Insert Song - "I Will Go"
 Lyrics：yozuca*, Composition：Shunryuu, Arrangement：chokix, Vocals：yozuca*
 Insert Song - "Helado"
 Lyrics：miru, Composition・Arrangement：Motoki Sekino, Vocals：miru
 Insert Song - "Flare of Hell"
 Lyrics・Composition：Shihori, Arrangement：littlelittle, Vocals：Aina Kase
 Insert Song - "Conspire"
 Lyrics：Faylan, Composition・Arrangement：Junpei Fujita, Vocals：Faylan
 Insert Song - 
 Lyrics：Ceui, Composition：Kotaru Odaka・Ceui, Arrangement：Kotaru Odaka, Vocals：Ceui

Music CDs 
 Valkyrie Complex Vocal Album

Radio 
 D.C. to VC Radio
 A radio special by Ai Hinaki as Kyrie Rason, Hijiri Kinomi as Regina Amarantain, and Aya Tachibana as Mapul.

Manga 
"Valkyrie Complex Zero" ran in Comp Ace from July to December 2009. It totals one volume and was written by Circus and illustrated by Hiro Touge.

References

External links
Official website 
 Valkyrie Complex Vocal Album
 

2009 video games
Fantasy anime and manga
Harem anime and manga
Eroge
Japan-exclusive video games
Video games developed in Japan
Visual novels
Bishōjo games
Seinen manga
Windows games
Windows-only games
Video games based on Norse mythology
Circus (company) games